See also:
1940s in comics,
other events of the 1950s,
1960s in comics and the
list of years in comics


Publications: 1950 - 1951 - 1952 - 1953 - 1954 - 1955 - 1956 - 1957 - 1958 - 1959

Publications

1950

Adventures into Terror #43 - Marvel Comics
Amazing Detective Cases #3 spin-off from Suspense - Marvel Comics
Apache Kid #1 - Marvel Comics
Black Rider #8 renamed from Western Winners - Marvel Comics
Cindy Smith #39 renamed from Cindy Comics - Marvel Comics
Crime Can't Win #41 renamed from Cindy Smith - Marvel Comics
Crime Can't Win #4 renumbered from #44 - Marvel Comics
Crime Exposed #1 - Marvel Comics
Crime Must Lose! #4 renamed from Romantic Affairs - Marvel Comics
Cowgirl Romances #28 renamed from Jeanie Comics - Marvel Comics
Gunhawk, The #12 renamed from Whip Wilson - Marvel Comics
Hedy of Hollywood #36 renamed from Hedy de Vine - Marvel Comics
Honeymoon #41 renamed from Gay Comics - Marvel Comics
It's a Ducks Life #1 - Marvel Comics
Journey into Unknown Worlds #36 renamed from Teen Comics - Marvel Comics
Kellys, The #23 renamed from Rusty Comics - Marvel Comics
Marvel Boy #1 - Marvel Comics
Men's Adventures #4 renamed from True Adventures - Marvel Comics
My Friend Irma #3 renamed from My Diary (comics) - Marvel Comics
Romantic Affairs #3 renamed from Romances of the West - Marvel Comics
Sports Action #2 renamed from Sports Stars - Marvel Comics
Real Experiences #25 renamed from Tiny Tessie - Marvel Comics
Reno Browne, Hollywood's Greatest Cowgirl #50  renamed from Margie Comics - Marvel Comics
Romantic Affairs #4 renamed from Romances of the West - Marvel Comics
Spy Cases #26 renamed from Kellys, The - Marvel Comics
Spy Cases #4 renumbered from #29 - Marvel Comics
True Adventures #3 renamed from True Western - Marvel Comics
True Life Tales #2 renumbered from #9 - Marvel Comics
True Secrets #3 renamed from Our Love - Marvel Comics
Two-Gun Western #5 renamed from Casey Crime Photographer - Marvel Comics
War Comics #1 - Marvel Comics
Whip Wilson #9 renamed from Rex Hart - Marvel Comics
Young Men #4 renamed from Cowboy Romances - Marvel Comics

1951

Adventures into Terror #3 renumbered from #45 - Marvel Comics
Arizona Kid #1 - Marvel Comics
Astonishing #3 renamed from Marvel Boy - Marvel Comics
Battle #1 - Marvel Comics
Combat Kelly #1 - Marvel Comics
Fightin' Marines #1-176 changes publisher to Charlton in 1955- St. John
Crime Cases Private Eye #1 - Marvel Comics
Journey into Unknown Worlds #4 renamed from #39 - Marvel Comics
Mystic #1 - Marvel Comics
Kent Blake of the Secret Service #1 - Marvel Comics
Rocky Jorden Private Eye #6 renamed from Crime Cases Private Eye - Marvel Comics
Young Men on the Battlefield #4 renamed from Young Men - Marvel Comics
Red Warrior #1 - Marvel Comics
Space Squadron #1 - Marvel Comics
Spy Fighters #1 - Marvel Comics
Strange Tales #1 - Marvel Comics
Texas Kid #1 - Marvel Comics

1952

Actual Confessions #13 renamed from Lova Adventures - Marvel Comics
Adventures into Weird Worlds #1 - Marvel Comics
Battle Action #1 - Marvel Comics
Battlefield #1 - Marvel Comics
Battlefront #1 - Marvel Comics
Combat #1 - Marvel Comics
Fighting Leathernecks #1-6 renamed United States Marines - Toby Press
Girl Confessions #13 renamed from Girl Comics - Marvel Comics
Journey into Mystery #1 - Marvel Comics
Men in Action #1 - Marvel Comics
Mystery Tales #1 - Marvel Comics
Patsy and Hedy #1 - Marvel Comics
Space World #6 renamed from Space Squadron - Marvel Comics
Spellbound #1 - Marvel Comics
Tell It to the Marines #1-16 changes publisher to I.W. Enterprises in 1964, also see Tell It to the Marines Super - Toby Press
U.S. Marines in Action #1-3 - Avon Periodicals
Uncanny Tales #1 - Marvel Comics
War Action #1 - Marvel Comics
War Adventures #1 - Marvel Comics
War Combat #1 - Marvel Comics

1953

Battle Brady #10 renamed from Men in Action - Marvel Comics
Bible Tales for Young Folk #1 - Marvel Comics
Bible Tales for Young People #3 renamed from Bible Tales for Young Folk - Marvel Comics
Buck Duck #1 - Marvel Comics
Combat Casey #6 renamed from War Combat - Marvel Comics
Crazy #1 - Marvel Comics
Homer Hooper #1 - Marvel Comics
Little Lizzie #1 - Marvel Comics
Lorna the Jungle Queen #1 - Marvel Comics
Menace #1 - Marvel Comics
Miss America #50 renamed from Miss America Magazine - Marvel Comics
Monkey and the Bear, The #1 - Marvel Comics
Patsy and her Pals #1 - Marvel Comics
Princess Knight, by Osamu Tezuka, is first serialized on Kodansha's Shōjo Club
Secret Story Romances #1 - Marvel Comics
Speed Carter, Spaceman #1 - Marvel Comics
The Topper #1 - D.C. Thomson and Co. Ltd
United States Marines #7-11 renamed from Fighting Leathernecks - Toby Press
Wendy Parker Comics #1 - Marvel Comics
Young Men #21 renamed from Young Men on the Battlefield - Marvel Comics
Young Men in Action #24 renamed from Young Men - Marvel Comics

1954

Arrowhead #1 - Marvel Comics
Battle Ground #1 - Marvel Comics
Crime Fighters Always Win #11 renamed from Crimefighters - Marvel Comics
Girl's Life #1 - Marvel Comics
Jungle Action #1 - Marvel Comics
Jungle Tales #1 - Marvel Comics
Lorna the Jungle Girl #6 renamed from Lorna the Jungle Queen - Marvel Comics
Marines in Battle #1-25 - Atlas Comics
Navy Action #1 - Marvel Comics
Outlaw Fighters #1 - Marvel Comics
Outlaw Kid #1 - Marvel Comics
Police Action #1 - Marvel Comics
Ringo Kid Western, The #1 - Marvel Comics
Riot #1 - Marvel Comics
Rugged Action #1 - Marvel Comics
Semper Fi #1-9 - Marvel Comics
Spy Thrillers #1 - Marvel Comics
Western Kid #1 - Marvel Comics
Western Outlaws #1 - Marvel Comics
Western Thrillers #1 - Marvel Comics
Wild #1 - Marvel Comics
With the Marines on the Battlefronts of the World #1-2 - Toby Press

1955

Adventures of Pinky Lee, The #1 - Marvel Comics
Billy Buckskin Western #1 - Marvel Comics
Black Knight. The #1 - Marvel Comics
Cowboy Action #5 renamed from Western Thrillers - Marvel Comics
Della Vision #1 - Marvel Comics
Gunsmoke Western #32 renamed from Western Tales of Black Rider - Marvel Comics
Homer the Happy Ghost #1 - Marvel Comics
Jann of the Jungle #8 renamed from Jungle Tales - Marvel Comics
Marines in Action #1-14 - Atlas Comics
Meet Miss Bliss #1 - Marvel Comics
My Girl Pearl #1 - Marvel Comics
Navy Combat #1 - Marvel Comics
Patty Powers #4 renamed from Della Vision - Marvel Comics
Police Badge#749 #5 renamed from Spy Thrillers - Marvel Comics
Rawhide Kid #1 - Marvel Comics
Strange Stories of Suspense #5 renamed from Rugged Action - Marvel Comics
Strange Tales of the Unusual #1 - Marvel Comics
Western Tales of Black Rider #28 renamed from Black Rider - Marvel Comics
Wyatt Earp #1 - Marvel Comics

1956

Adventure into Mystery #1 - Marvel Comics
Caught #1 - Marvel Comics
Date with Millie, A #1 - Marvel Comics
Devil-Dog Dugan #1-3 renamed Tales of the Marines - Atlas Comics
Frontier Western #1 - Marvel Comics
Matt Slade, Gunfighter #1 - Marvel Comics
Melvin the Monster #1 - Marvel Comics
My Love Story #1 - Marvel Comics
Mystical Tales #1 - Marvel Comics
Quick Trigger Western Action #12 renamed from Cowboy Action - Marvel Comics
Quick Trigger Western #13 renamed from Quick Trigger Western Action - Marvel Comics
Sailor Sweeney #12 renamed from Navy Action - Marvel Comics
Sgt. Barney Barker #1 - Marvel Comics
Sherry the Showgirl #1 - Marvel Comics
Stories of Romance #5 renamed from Meet Miss Bliss - Marvel Comics
True Tales of Love #22 renamed from Secret Story Romances - Marvel Comics
Two-Gun Western #4 renamed from Billy Buckskin Western - Marvel Comics
Western Gunfighters #20 renamed from Apache Kid - Marvel Comics
World of Fantasy #1 - Marvel Comics
World of Mystery #1 - Marvel Comics
World of Suspense #1 - Marvel Comics
Yellow Claw #1 - Marvel Comics

1957

Adventures of Homer Ghost #1 - Marvel Comics
Black Rider Rides Again, The #1 - Marvel Comics
Commando Adventures #1 - Marvel Comics
Date with Patsy, A #1 - Marvel Comics
Dexter the Demon #7 renamed from Melvin the Monster - Marvel Comics
G.I. Tales #4 renamed from Sgt. Barney Barker - Marvel Comics
Hedy Wolfe #1 - Marvel Comics
Kid from Dodge City, The #1 - Marvel Comics
Kid from Texas, The #1 - Marvel Comics
Marines at War #1-8 renamed from Tales of the Marines - Atlas Comics
Marvin Mouse #1 - Marvel Comics
Kid Slade, Gunfighter #5 renamed from Matt Slade, Gunfighter - Marvel Comics
Navy Action #15 renamed from Sailor Sweeney - Marvel Comics
Navy Tales #1 - Marvel Comics
Nellie the Nurse #1 - Marvel Comics
Showgirls #4 renamed from Sherry the Showgirl - Marvel Comics
Sherry the Showgirl #5 renamed from Showgirls - Marvel Comics
Showgirls #1 - Marvel Comics
Six-Gun Western #1 - Marvel Comics
Tales of the Marines #4 renamed Marines at War renamed from Devil-Dog Dugan - Atlas Comics
Western Trails #1 - Marvel Comics
Willie the Wise Guy #1 - Marvel Comics

1958

Strange Worlds #1 - Marvel Comics
Tell It to the Marines Super #1 also see Tell It to the Marines - I.W. Enterprises

August 
 August 13: Jack Cole dies at age 43.

1959

Kathy #1 - Marvel Comics
Date with Millie, A #1 - Marvel Comics
Tales of Suspense #1 - Marvel Comics
Tales to Astonish #1 - Marvel Comics

 
1950s decade overviews